Uladzimir is a given name. It is the Belarusian equivalent of Vladimir, Volodymyr, and Włodzimierz (Polish). The name may refer to:

Uladzimir Ignatik (born 1990), Belarusian professional tennis player
Uladzimir Karatkievich (1930–1984), Belarusian romantic writer
Uladzimir Karyzna (born 1938), Belarusian poet and songwriter
Uladzimir Kazlou (born 1985), Belarusian javelin thrower
Uladzimir Naumau (born 1956), Belarusian politician
Uladzimir Nyaklyayew (born 1946), Belarusian poet, writer and politician
Uladzimir Zhuravel (born 1971), Belarusian professional football coach and a former player

Belarusian masculine given names
Slavic masculine given names